Shenandoah Community School District is a school district headquartered in Shenandoah, Iowa. It operates Shenandoah Elementary School, Shenandoah Middle School, and Shenandoah High School.

Its boundaries include Shenandoah, Farragut, Imogene, and Northboro. It is mostly in Fremont and Page counties with small portions in Mills and Montgomery counties.

The district took control of the school buildings of the Farragut Community School District, which closed in 2016. Most of the Farragut district east of M-16, including Farragut and Imogene, was assigned to Shenandoah CSD.

The school's mascot are the Mustangs & Fillies. Their colors are maroon and white.

It is one of several school districts that accepts high school students from the K-8 Hamburg Community School District of Hamburg.

Schools
The district operates three schools, all in Shenandoah:
Logan Preschool
Shenandoah Elementary School
Shenandoah Middle School
Shenandoah High School

Shenandoah High School

Athletics
The Mustangs & Fillies compete in the Hawkeye 10 Conference in the following sports:

Fall Sports
Cross Country (boys and girls)
Boys' - 5-time State Champions (1974, 1975, 1988, 1989, 1991)
Football
Volleyball

Winter Sports
Basketball (boys and girls)
Bowling
Wrestling

Spring Sports
Golf (boys and girls)
Soccer (boys and girls)
Tennis (boys and girls)
Track and Field (boys and girls)

Summer Sports
Baseball
Softball

See also
List of school districts in Iowa
List of high schools in Iowa

References

External links
 Shenandoah Community School District
 
 
 District map - Iowa Department of Education

School districts in Iowa
Education in Fremont County, Iowa
Education in Mills County, Iowa
Education in Montgomery County, Iowa
Education in Page County, Iowa